Ingvarsson is a surname. Notable people with the surname include:

Ingvi Sigurður Ingvarsson (1924–2009), Icelandic diplomat
Jón Arnar Ingvarsson (born 1972), Icelandic basketball player
Júlíus Vífill Ingvarsson, Icelandic politician 
Martin Ingvarsson (born 1965), Swedish football referee
Niklas Ingvarsson (born 1978), Swedish ice sledge hockey player
Ragnvald Ingvarsson, Captain of the Varangian Guard 
Stefan Ingvarsson (1946–2017), Swedish racewalker
Sveinn Ingvarsson (1914–2009), Icelandic sprinter